Seer or Die Seer is an Austrian musical pop and schlager band founded in 1996 by Alfred Fred Jaklitsch after the break-up of the Austrian pop band Joy he was part of. After a brief solo career as Freddy Jay, he founded the band that comes from Grundlsee in Styria, Salzkammergut region of Austria.

The band had a long string of album releases many reaching number 1 on the Austrian official charts. The band also had a number of hit singles. It won the Amadeus Austrian Music Award in the category Group Pop / Rock in 2003 followed in 2009, with another Amadeus Award win in the Schlager category.

Members
The members have changed throughout the years.

Founding members
Alfred Fred Jaklitsch – vocals, guitar
Astrid Wirtenberger – vocals
Sabine Sassy Holzinger – vocals
Wolfgang Luckner – drums
Friedrich Spitz Hampel – vocals (until 2012)
Alois Huber – keyboards (until 2010)
Manfred Temmel – E guitar (until 2008)
Franz Rebensteiner – bass (until 2006)
Klaus Neuper – Styrian harmonica (until 1999)

Present line-up
Alfred Fred Jaklitsch – vocals, guitar
Astrid Wirtenberger – vocals
Sabine Sassy Holzinger – vocals
Wolfgang Luckner – drums
Jürgen Leitner – Styrian harmonica (since 1999)
Thomas Eder – E guitar (since 2003)
Dietmar Kastowsky – bass (since 2006)
Mario Pecoraro – keyboards (since 2010)

Discography

Albums

Compilations
 2002: Das Beste (Wild’s Wasser)
 2003: Das Beste 2
 2006: Seerisch – Ihre größten Stimmungshits
 2016: 20 Jahre – Nur das Beste!

Live albums

Special releases
 2001: Gold (Double-CD Über’n See/Auf und der Gams nach)
 2003: Gold Vol. 2 (Double-CD Baff!/Gössl)
 2004: Über’n Berg (Limited Edition and bonus online song "I vermiß di")
 2006: CD-Box Das Beste (albumsDas Beste/Das Beste 2/Das Beste 3)
 2007: Junischnee Limited Edition of original and bonus tracks)
 2007: Aufwind – Limited Edition of original and bonus tracks)

Videos 
 2005: Über’n Berg
 2008: Live! – 10 Jahre Open Air Grundlsee

Maxi-CDs 
 1995: Jodlertrance
 1997: Fix auf da Alm
 1997: Iß mit mir
 1997: Hey! Schäfer
 1998: Kirtog
 1999: A Wetta is immer und überall
 2003: Es braucht 2
 2005: Sun, Wind + Regen

Single-CDs

References

External links
Official website

Schlager groups
Austrian pop music groups